Heinz Kluge (born 21 May 1938) is a German biathlete. He competed in the 20 km individual event at the 1968 Winter Olympics.

References

External links
 

1938 births
Living people
German male biathletes
Olympic biathletes of East Germany
Biathletes at the 1968 Winter Olympics
People from Erzgebirgskreis
Sportspeople from Saxony